Nudity is the state of being unclothed.

Nudity or nude may also refer to:

Art 
 Nude (art), usually referred to as "The Nude", is a genre of art having the unclothed human body as its primary subject

 Nude (Renoir, Belgrade, 1910), a painting by Pierre-Auguste Renoir
 Nude (Charis, Santa Monica), a photograph taken by Edward Weston in 1936

Music 

 Nude (band), an international rock band, based in California
 Nude Records, a record label

Albums 

Nude (Camel album), 1981
 Nude (Dead or Alive album), 1989
 Nude (Remixed, Remodelled, Remixed), a remix album by Dead or Alive, 1991
Nude (VAST album)
 Nude (Aco album), 1997
 Nude (Loreen album), 2017

Songs 

 "Nude" (song), by Radiohead
"Nu-Di-Ty", a song by Kylie Minogue from X
"The Nude", a song by Catherine Wheel from Chrome
 "Nxde" (pronounced "Nude") a song by (G)I-dle from I Love

Film 
 Nude (2017 American film), directed by Anthony B. Sacco and Josh Shade
 Nude (2017 Marathi film), directed by Ravi Jadhav

Other uses 

NUDE (the National Union of Domestic Employees), founded by Clotil Walcott in Trinidad and Tobago.
 N.U.D.E.@ Natural Ultimate Digital Experiment, a 2003 video game
Nude, Iran, a village in Gilan Province, Iran

See also
 Nudes (disambiguation)
 Naked (disambiguation)
 Nudie (disambiguation)